Artilleriyskiy Tyagach Lyogkiy, or AT-L (meaning light artillery tractor) was a Soviet Cold War era artillery tractor. The vehicle has the same cab as the ZIS-150 and ZIL-164 trucks, but has a different front end and grille similar to that of the GAZ-51 truck.

Users

References

Artillery tractors
 
1950s cars
Military vehicles of the Soviet Union
Malyshev Factory products